Lynton is a town on the Exmoor coast in the North Devon district in the county of Devon, England, approximately  north-east of Barnstaple and  west of Minehead, and close to the confluence of the West Lyn and East Lyn rivers.

Governance
Lynton is part of the Lynton and Lynmouth electoral ward whose total ward population at the 2011 census was 1,647. The two communities are governed at local level by Lynton and Lynmouth Town Council.

Location and geography
The two settlements are connected by the Lynton and Lynmouth Cliff Railway.

The South West Coast Path and Tarka Trail pass through, and the Two Moors Way runs from Ivybridge in South Devon to Lynmouth. The Samaritans Way South West runs from Bristol to Lynton and the Coleridge Way from Nether Stowey to Lynmouth.

History and buildings

Evidence of Iron Age activity can be found at the nearby Roborough Castle.

Lynton's Parish Church of St Mary, stands overlooking the sea, surrounded by shops and hotels. The tower is mainly 13th century but the church itself has been enlarged and altered — most notably in 1741 and in late Victorian/early Edwardian times.

Many of the town's buildings were constructed in the latter part of the 19th century and the early 20th century. Lynton Town Hall was given to the town by Sir George Newnes, Bart., a major benefactor of the town; it was opened on 15 August 1900.  He also gave the town the United Reformed Church building (originally a Congregational church) on Lee Road.

Twinning
Lynton and Lynmouth are jointly twinned with Bénouville in France.

Transport
Lynton was once the terminus for the narrow-gauge Lynton & Barnstaple Railway, which served both towns.

, Lynton is served by the following bus services:
309/310 Lynton & Lynmouth - Barnstaple (Filers Travel)

Sport

The Lynton & Lynmouth Cricket Club, founded in August 1876, meet at the Valley of Rocks.

Notable people
Leslie McLean (1918–1987), cricketer

References

External links

 
 
Lynton & Lynmouth Town Council

Exmoor
Towns in Devon
Lynton and Lynmouth